The chub mackerel, Pacific mackerel, or Pacific chub mackerel (Scomber japonicus) is a species of fish in the tuna and mackerel family, Scombridae. This species of mackerel closely resembles the Atlantic chub mackerel.

Characteristics
The chub mackerel has a well-developed swim bladder attached with the esophagus, which the "true mackerels" in the genus Scomber lack, and a characteristic color difference is seen between the chub and the Atlantic chub, the latter being silvery-sided below the midline, whereas the lower part of the sides of the chub (otherwise colored somewhat like the Atlantic) are mottled with small dusky blotches, and the chub has a larger eye than the Atlantic. Less obvious differences are that the dorsal fins are closer together in the chub and only 9 or 10 spines are in its first dorsal fin instead of 11 or more, which is the usual count in the Atlantic mackerel. In most species, the mackerel is known to travel in large schools.

Habits
Chub mackerel school like Atlantic mackerel, and their feeding habits are much the same, eating the same species of pelagic crustaceans and Sagittae that the mackerel had taken at the same time and place, while specimens taken at Woods Hole ate chiefly copepods, to a lesser extent on amphipods, salps, appendicularians, and young herring. They follow thrown bait as readily and bite quite as greedily as Atlantic mackerel do. Their breeding habits have not been studied.

Fossil record
Fossils of Scomber japonicus have been found in the Pliocene of Italy (age range: from 3 to 2.2 million years ago.).

Distribution
Chub mackerel are widespread in the Indo-Pacific. They are absent from the Indian Ocean except for South Africa from KwaZulu-Natal to Western Cape, and are replaced by the closely related Atlantic chub mackerel in the Atlantic. The chub mackerel is widely distributed, usually found in the northwestern, southeastern, and northeastern Pacific. In the eastern Pacific, it can be found from central Mexico to southeastern Alaska. Chub mackerel are generally found within 20 miles (37 km) off the coast in waters between 50 and 72 °F (10 to 22 °C). Young mackerel live around sandy beaches or kelp beds, while adults are found in deeper waters in shallow banks to 1000 feet (300 m) deep. Chub mackerel school with other pelagic species, as well such as other types of mackerels and sardines.   In 2015 chub mackerels were found in Indian Ocean and the new species were classified as Scomber indicus.

Diet
As larvae, chub mackerel feed mainly on copepods and rotifers and sometimes even smaller larvae of their own kind.  Chub mackerel larvae can consume up to 87% of their dry body weight a day.  As juveniles, chub mackerel feed mainly on zooplankton.  As adults, they feed on mysids and euphausids.

Spawning and maturation
Spawning between chub mackerel typically occurs at temperatures of 59 to 68 °F.  This in turn, leads to different mating seasons depending on what part of the hemisphere they are located.  Females lay about 100,000 to 400,000 eggs during breeding season.  The mackerel is constantly competing with other fish for food. Although maturation of chub mackerel has never been thoroughly documented, data show that spawning can happen from March through October, but mostly happens from April through August.  Sometimes in females, ripe translucent eggs appear simultaneously with unripe ova in early stages of development; this is also seen with the Atlantic mackerel.

Defense mechanisms
The chub mackerel relies on camouflaging itself to stay hidden from its predators.  It has a dorsal pattern very similar to the light pattern of the waves and sun.  When in danger, the fish move close to the surface of the water to merge with the flickering light of the sun making them difficult to see from above, which protects them from predatory birds. The countershading on their ventral surfaces likewise makes it difficult for larger predatory fish like tuna and barracuda to pick them out from the background.

Fisheries

Known to fisherman as the hardhead, the chub mackerel is regularly fished and canned for human consumption, pet food, bait, or served fresh.  From 1980 to 1989, the recreational catch average in California was 1,462 tons.  Since they have begun being fished, the chub mackerel reached its catching peak in 1978 with 3,412,602 tons.  Since 1978, the catch ratings have continued to decrease, but picked back up a little in 1995.  The ideal method for catching chub mackerel is round-haul gear such as purse seines.  Bycatch is low because nets are placed directly on schools of fish.  Chub mackerel are caught all year round, but especially between June and November.  They can be caught on both sides of North America, but the most important fisheries commercially are in California and Mexico.

As food
According to nutrition specialists, the chub mackerel is a healthy meal, high in protein and rich in omega-3 and unsaturated fatty acids.  Due to its high energy and protein intake, and low carbohydrate value, it is recommended in the diets of growing children and pregnant women, although it may contain high levels of heavy metals.  The chub mackerel is a popular dish in Sicilian cuisine, in which it is served in a variety of ways.  In the Sicilian culture, the chub mackerel is called a variety of names, strummu ucchiutu, varatulu scrummu, or occhiutu.  In the kitchen and market, the fish is in the best condition if the meat is firm and the eyes are clear with the colors bright.  For the most part, it is eaten fresh, but can be seen pickled or frozen.  In Sicilian cuisine, it is also served filleted and raw, marinated in oil, lemon, salt, and pepper. Jorim is a Korean dish made with tofu, vegetables, meat and seafood. Mackerel is also one of the most popular foods for Koreans as jorim.

References

Further references

 
 
 Pacific mackerel NOAA FishWatch. Retrieved 11 November 2012.
Collette, B., et al. 2011. Scomber japonicus. In: IUCN 2012. IUCN Red List of Threatened Species. Version 2012.2. Downloaded on 7 June 2013.

External links
 Photos of Scomber japonicus in iNaturalist

Scomber
Fish of East Asia
Fish described in 1782
Fish of Japan
Fish of Korea
Taxa named by Martinus Houttuyn